The women's 1500 metres event at the 2003 European Athletics U23 Championships was held in Bydgoszcz, Poland, at Zawisza Stadion on 17 and 19 July.

Medalists

Results

Final
19 July

†: Rasa Drazdauskaitė ranked initially 2nd (4:12.16), but was disqualified for infringement of IAAF doping rules.

Heats
17 July
Qualified: first 4 in each heat and 4 best to the Final

Heat 1

†: Rasa Drazdauskaitė initially reached the final (4:14.90), but was disqualified later for infringement of IAAF doping rules.

Heat 2

Participation
According to an unofficial count, 25 athletes from 18 countries participated in the event.

 (1)
 (1)
 (1)
 (1)
 (1)
 (1)
 (1)
 (1)
 (2)
 (2)
 (1)
 (2)
 (1)
 (1)
 (2)
 (2)
 (1)
 (3)

References

1500 metres
1500 metres at the European Athletics U23 Championships